Prema Narayan (born 4 April 1955) is a former Model and Bollywood actress-dancer. She has acted in Hindi and Bengali cinema. She was the Femina Miss India World 1971, and represented India at Miss World 1971.

Early life
Prema Narayan was born in Kalimpong, West Bengal. She is the niece of actor Anita Guha.

Career
Prema Narayan was an English teacher in a convent school. Later she opted for modelling. In 1971, she participated in Femina Miss India contest and was crowned Femina Miss India World 1971. She represented India at Miss World 1971 but did not win. The same year she was appointed to represent India at Queen of the Pacific pageant held in Australia where she was crowned 1st runner-up.

Acting career
She chose Bollywood after offers started coming her way after winning the Femina Miss India contest. Her performance in films such as Manzilein Aur Bhi Hain (1973) and Maa Bahen Aur Biwi (1973) were noticed. She did not restrict herself as a leading lady as she was mostly considered for dancer/vamp or supporting roles. She got recognition for her work on being nominated in 1976 in Filmfare Award for Best Supporting Actress category for her performance as a sensuous village belle Dhanno in the Uttam Kumar-Sharmila Tagore film Amanush (1975). This role was a total deviation from her modern sex-symbol well-educated western image. Besides being noticed for her acting prowess she was also appreciated for her western-style dance numbers. She regularly featured in lower-grade horror films including Hotel, Mangalsutra, Saat Saal Baad and Ghabrahat.

Her last appearance was in Yeh Basti Badmashon Ki (1999).

Personal life
She is married to Rajiv, a lawyer. The couple has two adult sons.

Filmography

Awards & nominations
 Filmfare Award for Best Supporting Actress: Amanush: Nominated

References

External links
 

1955 births
Living people
Indian beauty pageant winners
Miss World 1971 delegates
Actresses in Hindi cinema
Indian film actresses
20th-century Indian actresses
Female models from West Bengal
Actresses from West Bengal